A referendum on the Dominican Republic–Central America Free Trade Agreement (CAFTA) was held in Costa Rica on 7 October 2007. It was originally to be held on 23 September 2007, but it was postponed on 5 June 2007 due to a court challenge. Opinion polls from April, July and August 2007 suggested that a majority of voters were in favour, while a poll from June saw a majority against. It was ultimately approved by 51.56% of voters.

The movement against the CAFTA Referendum in Costa Rica brought many members of the Citizens' Action Party to national politics. Several anti-CAFTA organizers have been elected to the Legislative Assembly.

Party positions
Several parties and organizations held a position against CAFTA. These parties were: Citizens' Action, Broad Front , Social Christian Unity, Accessibility without Exclusion, National Integration, People's Vanguard, National Rescue, Costa Rican Renewal and a sector of National Liberation known as Liberacionistas contra el TLC (Liberationists against CAFTA). Other organizations that endorsed the "No" vote include nearly all trade unions (APSE, ANDE, SEC, ANEP, FIT-ICE, UNDECA, SINDEU), environmentalists (APREFLOFAS, Coecoceiba, FECON), Costa Rica Firefighter Corps, the Lutheran Costa Rican Church, the LGBT Rights movement, and the  Cámara de Empresarios Pro-Costa Rica (Pro-Costa Rica Chamber of Commerce). Other organizations against the free trade agreement include the students' federation of all four public universities and their respective rectors; the movement itself (Patriotic Movement Against CAFTA) was directed by Costa Rica Institute of Technology rector Eugenio Trejoses

National Liberation Party, Libertarian Movement, National Union Party, and National Restoration Party were in favor of Costa Rica's entry to CAFTA, as so was the majority of Social Christian Unity's congressmen in that legislature. Almost all commerce chambers that made up the Union of Commerce Chambers and Private Enterprise Associations (UCCAEP) also voiced their support for the "Yes" vote. The official movement was called the Citizens' Alliance for Yes and it was led by one of the government's ministers, Alfredo Volio Escalante.

Results
According to the Electoral Supreme Tribunal, the referendum was approved by voters in San Jose, Cartago, Heredia, and Limon provinces. Meanwhile, a majority of voters in Alajuela, Guanacaste and Puntarenas provinces rejected the proposal.

By canton

References

External links
Tribunal Supremo de Elecciones 
 Tribunal Supremo de Elecciones: Referéndum (Referendum Site) 
Tribunal Supremo de Elecciones  Election Results

Referendums in Costa Rica
Costa Rica
2007 in Costa Rica
2007 in international relations